Sue Law is a retired English footballer and current head of equality and child protection at the Football Association (FA). She played as a defender and represented England at senior international level.

Law won around 40 caps for England as a right back or central defender. Her debut came as a 19–year–old in a win over Wales in the Isle of Man on 17 August 1985. She took over the right back position later that year from Carol Thomas, then England's most capped player and second longest serving captain. England won the match 6–0. In November 1992 Law played her final match for England at Millmoor, Rotherham in the EURO 1993 quarter final second–leg meeting with Italy. In what was the final match to be played under Women's Football Association (WFA) control, England lost 3–0 (6–2 on aggregate) amidst farcical scenes. Louise Waller was sent off for deliberate handball, while Law, hampered by a back injury, scored an own goal.

She was part of Millwall Lionesses' 1991 WFA Cup winning team; having joined the Lionesses in 1988. She later played for Bromley Borough.

References

Bibliography

 

Living people
Year of birth missing (living people)
Footballers from Greater London
Millwall Lionesses L.F.C. players
Charlton Athletic W.F.C. players
English women's footballers
FA Women's National League players
England women's international footballers
Women's association football defenders